Sex Slaves (also Sex Slave$) is a 2005 documentary film by Ric Esther Bienstock that was produced in association with CBC, Frontline (PBS), Channel 4 and Canal D.

Genesis and Background 
It provides a firsthand account of international human trafficking by exploring the Eastern European countries such as Moldova and Ukraine where girls are recruited, then following the trail to the various countries and locales where they end up. Interviews with traffickers, experts, police vice-squads and former sex slaves, along with undercover footage, provide a glimpse into the frightening reality and scope of the problem.

Plot 
One husband's journey is documented as he attempts to rescue his pregnant wife who was sold by a trafficker who befriended them, to a notoriously powerful and violent pimp in Turkey.

Awards and Accolades 
Sex Slaves won numerous awards, including a 2007 Emmy Award for Outstanding Investigative Journalism, the Edward R. Murrow Award from the Overseas Press Club of America, a Gracie Award from American Women in Radio and Television, a British Broadcast Award for Best Documentary. a Royal Television Society Award from the UK and a BAFTA nomination, among others.

See also 
Sexual slavery
Trafficking in human beings

References

External links 
PBS Frontline: Sex Slaves
SEX SLAVE$ - Homepage 

Washington Post interview with Ric Bienstock

2005 television films
2005 films
Documentary films about prostitution
Canadian documentary films
Documentary films about slavery
Works about sex trafficking
Forced prostitution
2005 documentary films
Documentary films about violence against women
2000s Canadian films